Gangapuram Kishan Reddy (born 15 June 1960) is an Indian politician who is currently serving as Minister of Tourism, Culture and Development of North Eastern Region of India. He is a member of the Bharatiya Janata Party (BJP). He is an MP representing Secunderabad (Lok Sabha constituency) since 2019. He served as the floor leader of the BJP in the Andhra Pradesh Legislative Assembly in 2009 and gave it up after being elected as the state BJP president of erstwhile Andhra Pradesh.

Early life
Gangapuram Kishan Reddy, was born in Timmapur village in Rangareddy district of Telangana to G. Swamy Reddy and Andalamma. He did a diploma in tool design from CITD.

Political career
Reddy started his political career as a youth leader of the Janta Party in 1977.

Once the BJP was formed in 1980, he joined the party full time. He became the state treasurer of the state Bharatiya Janata Yuva Morcha, Andhra Pradesh.  
From 1982 to 1983  he was Bharatiya Janata Party Andhra Pradesh Yuva Morcha State Treasurer 
From 1983 to 1984  he was Bharatiya Janata Party State Secretary, Bharatiya Janata Yuva Morcha, Andhra Pradesh

Reddy started his career as a youth leader. He was elected as National President of Bharatiya Janata Yuva Morcha from 2002 to 2005. He was elected as an MLA from Himayatnagar constituency in 2004 and was elected again in 2009 & 2014 to the Amberpet assembly constituency with a majority of over 27,000 votes.

From 1986 to 1990 he was the State President, Bharatiya Janata Yuva Morcha, Andhra Pradesh 
From 1990 to 1992 he was the National Secretary, Bharatiya Janata Yuva Morcha & In-charge of the South India 
From 1992 to 1994 he was the National Vice President of the Bharatiya Janata Yuva Morcha 
From 1994 to 2001 he was the National General Secretary of the Bharatiya Janata Yuva Morcha 
From 2001 to 2002 he was the State Treasurer, State Spokesperson & Head Quarter Incharge of  Bharatiya Janata Party, Andhra Pradesh  
From 2002 to 2004 he was the National President of the BJYM 
From 2004 to 2005 he was the State GS and official spokesperson, BJP Andhra Pradesh

MLA
He was unanimously elected as the Telangana BJP president succeeding Bandaru Dattatreya. Between 2004 and 2009 he was the MLA, Himayatnagar Constituency, Floor Leader of BJP in State Assembly 
From 2009 to 2014 He was the MLA, Amberpet Assembly Constituency, Floor Leader of BJP in State Assembly

Reddy, began the 22-day Telangana "Poru Yatra"– a  journey through 986 villages and 88 assembly constituencies stressing the need for a stance on Telangana state – on 19 January.

From 2010 to 2014, he was the BJP State President of the Andhra Pradesh.

From 2014 to 2016, he was the BJP State President of the Telangana   From 2014 to 2018 he was the MLA, Amberpet Assembly Constituency  From 2016 to 2018 he was the Floor Leader, State Assembly Telangana

Union Minister
From  2019 he was the MP Lok Sabha Secunderabad Constituency

On 30 May 2019, he was sworn in as Union Minister of State (MoS) for Home Affairs in the Government of India. From 2019 to 2021 Minister of State for Home Affairs, Government of India (Served along with Nityanand Rai)

Considering the increase in demand for local public transport, he wrote a letter to the chief minister of Telangana, K. Chandrashekar Rao, urging him to resume MMTS services in the city.

From  2021 he is the Minister of Tourism, Minister of Culture and Minister of Development of North Eastern Region, Government of India

On 18 June 2022, the union Tourism Minister G Kishan Reddy explaining the training process of Agnipath Scheme at a press conference, stated that the people selected as Agniveers would be given training for the "skills of drivers, washermen, barbers, electricians and other professionals". The video clip of the remark became viral. Reddy said that there would be drivers, electricians, barbers and thousands other posts and people selected under this scheme, would be helpful in those jobs. A reporter noted that  Skill Development Corporations was already established to train youth with different skills, Reddy answered that such skills would be imparted in Agnipath scheme as well.

References

External links
 MHA Website
 Twitter

Bharatiya Janata Party politicians from Telangana
Living people
1964 births
Andhra Pradesh MLAs 2004–2009
Andhra Pradesh MLAs 2009–2014
Telangana MLAs 2014–2018
India MPs 2019–present
Narendra Modi ministry
Union Ministers from Telangana